Johann Sebastian Bach composed the church cantata  (God the Lord is sun and shield), 79, in Leipzig in 1725, his third year as Thomaskantor, for Reformation Day and led the first performance on 31 October 1725.

The text was written by an unknown poet, who did not refer to the prescribed readings for the day. Bach began the libretto for the feast with a quotation from Psalm 84 and included two hymn stanzas, the first from Martin Rinckart's "", associated with Reformation Day in Leipzig, as the third movement, and as the last movement the final stanza of Ludwig Helmbold's "". Bach composed a work of "festive magnificence", structured in six movements, with an aria following the opening chorus, a pair of recitative and duet following the first chorale. He scored the work for three vocal soloists, a four-part choir, and a Baroque instrumental ensemble of two horns, timpani, two transverse flutes (added for a later performance), two oboes, strings and continuo. He achieved a unity within the structure by using the horns not only in the opening but also as obbligato instruments in the two chorales, the first time even playing the same motifs.

Bach performed the cantata again, probably in 1730. He later reworked the music of the opening chorus and a duet again in his Missa in G major, BWV 236, and the music of an alto aria in his Missa in A major, BWV 234.

History and words 
Bach composed the cantata in his third year as Thomaskantor in Leipzig. While he had written complete annual cycles for many occasions of the liturgical year the first two years in the position, he slowed down in the third. For the Reformation Day, he composed this new cantata, his first extant work for the occasion. The prescribed readings for the feast day were from the Second Epistle to the Thessalonians, "be steadfast against adversaries", and from the Book of Revelation, fear God and honour him. The writer of the text – an unknown poet – was not concerned about the readings, and began with a quotation from Psalm 84. He included the first stanza from Martin Rinckart's hymn "" and as the closing chorale the final stanza of Ludwig Helmbold's hymn "". According to the Bach scholar Klaus Hofmann, the first of these hymns was sung regularly after the sermon on Reformation Day in Leipzig.

Bach first performed the cantata on 31 October 1725. He repeated it again, probably in 1730, with minor changes in the scoring, doubling the oboes by flutes and assigning a flute as the obbligato instrument in the alto aria.
 He used the music of the opening chorus and the duet again in his Missa in G major, BWV 236, and the music of the alto aria in his Missa in A major, BWV 234.

Music

Structure and scoring 
Bach structured the cantata in six movements. A choral movement is followed by an aria, a chorale, recitative and duet, closed by another chorale. He scored the work for three vocal soloists (soprano, alto, bass), a four-part choir and a Baroque instrumental ensemble of two horns (Co), timpani (Ti), two flauto traverso (Ft), two oboes (Ob), two violins (Vl), viola (Va), and basso continuo. The title page of the autograph score reads: "Festo Reformat. / Gott der Herr ist Sonn und Schild / a / 4 Voci / 2 Corni / Tamburi / 2 Hautb. / 2 Viol. / Viola / e / Cont. / di / J.S.Bach".

In the following table of the movements, the scoring follows the Neue Bach-Ausgabe. The keys and time signatures are taken from Alfred Dürr, using the symbol for common time (4/4). The continuo, playing throughout, is not shown.

Movements 

As Hofmann points out, Bach achieved "festive magnificence", using two horns and timpani not only in the opening chorus but also as obbligato instruments in the two chorales. Bach established unity of form by using a horn motif from the first movement again in the first chorale, juxtaposed to the hymn tune.

1 
The cantata opens with a choral movement, "" (God the Lord is sun and shield). The instrumental ritornello introduces two themes: "a festive, march-like theme for the horns and timpani, and a more lively counter-theme that develops from a note that is heard seven times." The musicologist Julian Mincham notes that the ritornello, structured in three parts, is among the longest among Bach's opening choruses. The horns are silent in the middle section, but the voices enter "an imitative discussion of a simplified version of the string theme from the ritornello. Complex contrapuntal texture is used as the vehicle to convey the important and ultimately optimistic message ... The driving rhythms infusing the intricate swirling counterpoint produce an effect that is totally infectious", as Mincham writes. John Eliot Gardiner, who conducted during his Bach Cantata Pilgrimage in 2000 the cantatas for Reformation at the Schlosskirche in Wittenberg where the Reformation began, describes the opening chorus as a ceremonial procession, and hears the "insistent drum beat" going along with the "fanfares of the high horns" as "the hammering of Luther’s theses to the oak door at the back of the church".

2 
The aria for alto and an obbligato oboe, "" (God is our sun and shield!), expresses similar ideas as the first movement in a personal way, described as "tranquil and individual" by Mincham. In a later version, the oboe is replaced by a transverse flute.

3 
In the first chorale, "" (Now let everyone thank God), Bach uses the first theme of the opening again, simultaneously with the chorale tune. Helmuth Rilling notes the unity of topic, praise and thanks to God, for the first three movements. The praise, individual in the preceding aria, is now communal again, "a rousing hymn, now given the most extrovert of settings!" Gardiner assumes that the sermon may have followed the chorale.

4 
The only recitative, sung by the bass, "" (Praise God, we know the right way to blessedness), mentions the reason for thanks on this occasion. The phrase "" (You have instructed us through Your word) addresses "the basic issues of the Reformation", as Rilling points out.

5 
A duet for bass and soprano, "" (God, ah God, abandon Your own ones never again!), expresses a prayer for protection. The voices are in homophony, beginning without the instruments, while a "sharply contoured violin theme" appears first alone, then together with the voices. All violins play it in unison. The motif was attributed by the Bach scholar Albert Schweitzer to tumult, representing the "raging of enemies" mentioned in the text.

6 
The cantata ends with a four-part setting of the second chorale, "" (Uphold us in the truth), asking for the gifts of truth and eternal freedom.

The horns play again independently, but not in the rousing way of movement 3.

Recordings 
The entries are taken from the listing on the Bach Cantatas Website. Ensembles playing period instruments in historically informed performances are marked green under the header .

References

Sources 
 
 Gott, der Herr, ist Sonn und Schild BWV 79; BC A 184 / Sacred cantata (Reformation Day 31 October) Bach Digital
 BWV 79 Gott der Herr ist Sonn und Schild text, scoring, University of Alberta
 Luke Dahn: BWV 79.3 bach-chorales.com
 Luke Dahn: BWV 79.6 bach-chorales.com

Church cantatas by Johann Sebastian Bach
1725 compositions
Psalm-related compositions by Johann Sebastian Bach